"Still the Same" is a song by the British rock band Slade, released in 1987 as the lead single from their fourteenth studio album You Boyz Make Big Noize. The song was written by lead vocalist Noddy Holder and bassist Jim Lea, and produced by John Punter. It reached No. 73 in the UK, remaining in the charts for four weeks.

Background
Slade began writing and recording material for their You Boyz Make Big Noize album in 1986. Hoping to record a hit album that would put them back in the public eye, "Still the Same" was chosen by RCA as the album's lead single. Plans for a Christmas 1986 release were scrapped and the single was held back until 1987 as an attempt to avoid Slade's label as being a Christmas-only band. Released in February 1987, "Still the Same" reached No. 73 in the UK. In the UK, the single suffered from a lack of radio play; it was only B-Listed on BBC Radio 1, rather than being placed on the A-List.

In a 1987 fan club interview, guitarist Dave Hill spoke of the song's lack of chart success: ""Still the Same" is basically being regarded as a flop in terms of what was expected of it. I think the record company were mostly disappointed, as it was more them than the group who chose it. It was always up for a single though, right from the demo stage. "Still the same" did virtually the same as "My Oh My" chart-wise in its first few weeks, but at the point where "My Oh My" picked up the radio play, "Still the Same" was dropped completely, especially by Radio One." Hill felt the song "deserved to go much higher in the charts than it did".

Release
"Still the Same" was released on 7" and 12" vinyl by RCA Records in the UK, Germany and Portugal. The 12" vinyl was released across other European countries too. The B-side, "Gotta Go Home", was exclusive to the single and would later appear on the band's 2007 compilation B-Sides. In the UK, a special limited edition commemorative version of the single was also issued to mark and celebrate Slade's 21st anniversary. This double pack edition included an additional 7" vinyl with "The Roaring Silence" as the A-side and "Don't Talk to Me About Love" as the B-side. The former track would appear on You Boyz Make Big Noize, while the latter would later be re-used as a B-Side for the band's 1987 single "Ooh La La in L.A.". On the 12" single, an extended version of "Still the Same" was featured as the A-side.

Promotion
No music video was filmed to promote the single. In the UK, the band performed the song on the TV shows The Tom O'Connor Show and Saturday Superstore. To promote the single in record stores, posters were produced, although these were mainly distributed to London retailers.

Critical reception
Upon release Kerrang! described the song as a "soggy offering", preferring the "far more listenable" B-side "Gotta Go Home". In a review of You Boyz Make Big Noize, American newspaper Record-Journal said the song was a "hook-filled, powerful tune", "resplendent in its anthemic arrangement and heavenly harmonizing chorus". In a retrospective review, Doug Stone of AllMusic commented: "Slade's headiest daze long gone, the band amazingly squeezes out sparks like "Still the Same": always tunefully tight, but loose enough to sing in the pub."

Formats
7" Single
"Still the Same" - 3:53
"Gotta Go Home" - 3:18

12" Single
"Still the Same (Extended Version)" - 5:33
"Gotta Go Home" - 3:18

2x 7" Commemorative Double Pack Single
"Still the Same" - 3:53
"Gotta Go Home" - 3:18
"The Roaring Silence" - 2:48
"Don't Talk to Me About Love" - 2:28

Cover versions
In 2003, Belgian band Mama's Jasje recorded the song for their fifth studio album Zwart Op Wit. The track was titled "Voor Jou Alleen" which translates to "For You Alone". As a result of the changed lyrics, Peter Van Laet also received a writing credit. The song became a hit in Belgium, peaking at No. 4.

Chart performance

Personnel
Slade
Noddy Holder - lead vocals
Jim Lea - synthesizer, bass, backing vocals, producer of all B-Sides
Dave Hill - lead guitar, backing vocals
Don Powell - drums

Additional personnel
John Punter - producer of "Still the Same"
Quick On The Draw Ltd. - design

References

1987 singles
1987 songs
Slade songs
RCA Records singles
Songs written by Noddy Holder
Songs written by Jim Lea
Song recordings produced by John Punter